Storage Wars Canada was a Canadian reality television series on OLN. It was the first international version of Storage Wars. The series follows a group of buyers looking to strike it big by buying storage units at auctions when rent is not paid. OLN started filming season 2 on June 12, 2014 with two auctions in Orillia, Ontario.

Series overview

Episode list 

No. in season refers to the episode's number in that particular season, whereas No. in series refers to the episode's number in the overall series.

Season 1 (2013)

Season 2 (2015)

External links 
 City TV
 OLN

References 

Storage Wars Canada

Episodes, Canada